Suryo Nugroho (born 17 April 1995) is an Indonesian para badminton player. He won the bronze medal in the men singles SU5 event of the 2020 Summer Paralympics.

Awards and nominations

Achievements

Paralympic Games 
Men's singles

World Championships
Men's singles

Men's doubles

Asian Para Games 
Men's singles

Men's doubles

Asian Championships 
Men's singles

ASEAN Para Games 
Men's singles

Men's doubles

BWF Para Badminton World Circuit (1 runner-up) 

The BWF Para Badminton World Circuit – Grade 2, Level 1, 2 and 3 tournaments has been sanctioned by the  Badminton World Federation from 2022. 

Men's doubles

International Tournaments (12 titles, 8 runners-up) 
Men's singles

Men's doubles

Mixed doubles

References

1995 births
Living people
People from Surabaya
Indonesian para-badminton players
Paralympic badminton players of Indonesia
Paralympic bronze medalists for Indonesia
Paralympic medalists in badminton
Medalists at the 2020 Summer Paralympics
Badminton players at the 2020 Summer Paralympics
Indonesian male badminton players